Trimerus is an extinct genus of trilobite in the family Homalonotidae. There is one described species in Trimerus, T. dekayi.

References

Homalonotidae
Articles created by Qbugbot